Metopograpsus is a genus of crabs, containing the following extant species:
Metopograpsus frontalis Miers, 1880
Metopograpsus latifrons (White, 1847)
Metopograpsus messor (Forsskål, 1775)
Metopograpsus oceanicus (Hombron & Jacquinot, 1846)
Metopograpsus quadridentatus Stimpson, 1858
Metopograpsus thukuhar (Owen, 1839)
A further extinct species is known.

Gallery

References

Grapsidae
Taxa named by Henri Milne-Edwards